Marty Moore is an Australian former professional rugby league footballer who played in the 1990s. He played for South Sydney, Balmain and Penrith in the New South Wales Rugby League (NSWRL) and ARL competitions.

Playing career
Moore made his first grade debut for Balmain in round 9 1994 against Newcastle at Leichhardt Oval.  Moore scored a try in a 26–22 victory.

Moore played 11 games in his debut season as Balmain finished last on the table and claimed the wooden spoon.  It was only the fourth time in the club's long and proud history in which they finished last.

In 1995, Moore joined Penrith and scored a try on debut for the club against Parramatta at Penrith Park.  Moore made 11 appearances for Penrith and was released at the end of the season.

He then joined South Sydney in 1996.  Moore spent two years at Souths in which the club finished second last on both occasions.  At the end of 1997, Moore was released by Souths.  Moore then spent time playing out in the Group 10 competition with the Bathurst Penguins.

References

1969 births
Living people
Australian rugby league players
South Sydney Rabbitohs players
Penrith Panthers players
Balmain Tigers players
Place of birth missing (living people)
Rugby league wingers
Rugby league centres